Paramathi is a panchayat town in Namakkal district in the Indian state of Tamil Nadu. It is the headquarter of Paramathi block.

Demographics
 India census, Paramathi had a population of 10,957. Males constitute 50% of the population and females 50%. Paramathi has an average literacy rate of 69%, higher than the national average of 59.5%: male literacy is 77%, and female literacy is 61%. In Paramathi, 11% of the population is under 6 years of age.

Education

Schools
 Government Higher Secondary School, Palapatti, Namakkal
 Government Boys Higher Secondary School, Paramathi, Namakkal.
 Government Girls Higher Secondary School, Paramathi, Namakkal.
 Malar Matric Higher Secondary School, Paramathi, Namakkal.
 sivabakkiam Muthusamy Matric Higher Secondary school, Paramathi, Namakkal.

colleges 
 K.S. Maniam College of Education, Irukkur Post, Paramathi Velur-Tk, Namakkal-Dt
 Kandaswami Kandar's College, Velur, Paramathi velur-Tk, Namakkal.
 PGP Group of Educational Institutions, NH-7, Namakkal to Paramathi Main Road, Namakkal.
These colleges can be connected to Paramathi with 5 kilometers. And also there are many colleges nearby Namakkal, Rasipuram, Tiruchengode, Karur and Erode which are connected approximately 35 kilometers each.

Economy

Agriculture, lorry and poultry farms are the main source for the economy apart from this textiles, oil mills, etc.

Transport 
Paramathi is located on the highway NH7 which connects Salem and Namakkal and Karur. And also located on the SH86 which connects Tiruchengode and Karur.

Paramathi is well connected by private and government buses from Tiruchengode, Erode, Salem, Namakkal, Rasipuram, Karur, Sankagiri, Attur, Paramathi-Velur, Edappadi, etc., 
The nearest railway station is Pugalur Railway Station (13 km) and Mohanur Railway Station (20 km). The nearest major Railway Junction is Namakkal Railway Station (24 km),  Karur Railway Station (27 km) and Salem Railway Station (73 km)

References

Cities and towns in Namakkal district